Essex Airlink is the brand given to two airport bus services run by First Essex. The brand was relaunched at Stansted Airport, England, on 17 February 2020. There are two routes, X10 and X30, which start their journey in Basildon bus station and Southend Travel Centre respectively. The two routes meet on the A130 and then follow the same route from there to Chelmsford where the route then splits with daytime X30 journeys traveling via Broomfield Road and serving Broomfield Hospital before compared to the X10, and night-time X30 journeys, taking a faster route to Stansted.

X10
Route X10 began operation in July 2016 using Volvo 7900 Hybrids temporarily taken from First Essex's 100 service. It runs from Basildon to Stansted via Wickford, Chelmsford, and Barnston. It is currently operated by five Alexander Dennis Enviro200 MMCs that were launched in November 2016 along with another seven for the X30. Route X10 buses used to carry "From Here to Air" branding. Two buses have since been repainted into the new Essex Airlink livery with branding for the X10 destinations.

Basildon and Wickford had a previous service to Stansted Airport, the X40. The service began in May 2009 but was withdrawn in February 2010 due to low usage.

X30
Route X30 is both busier and longer than the X10. Until the recent introduction of the new Alexander Dennis Enviro400 MMC bodied Scania N250UD double deck buses in February 2020, journeys were frequently overcrowded with passengers having to stand for part or the whole of their journey. To help with the overcrowding, First introduced two Wright Eclipse Gemini 2 bodied Volvo B9TL buses in 2018, which were used on certain journeys, notably the 06:00 and 06:50 departures from Southend and the 16:45 and 17:47 departures from Chelmsford which suffered from some of the worst overcrowding. They were used alongside the Alexander Dennis Enviro200 MMC buses delivered in 2016 in X30 "From Pier to Air" branding.

The new buses introduced in February 2020 feature leather seats, free WiFi, USB and wireless charging, table and solo seating, luggage racks, and next stop audio visual announcements. They are the only buses other than the Alexander Dennis Enviro200 MMCs used on the Chelmsford Park and Ride to feature next stop audio visual announcements in Essex. The luggage rack is monitored by CCTV which is shown on display on the top deck so that the passengers can still see their luggage from the top deck.

The X30 has existed as other routes in the past.

During the COVID-19 pandemic the X30 was diverted along Broomfield Road during the day time to serve Broomfield Hospital. This route change is still in operation.

From 10 October 2022, the frequency of the section between Southend and Rayleigh was increased from hourly to half-hourly.

Fleet

Current fleet

Previous fleet

References

Airport bus services
Basildon (town)
Bus routes in England
Transport in Southend-on-Sea
Transport in the City of Chelmsford
2020 establishments in England